Light Up the World may refer to:

 Light Up the World (Desperation Band album)
 Light Up the World (Steps album)
 "Light Up the World" (Glee song), 2011
 "Light Up the World" (Steps song), 2012
 Light Up the World Foundation, a non-profit humanitarian organization involved in the appropriate technology movement